Charlotte Maria King (1864-1937) was a botanist, mycologist and agronomist who worked at the Iowa State College Agricultural Experiment Station.

Written works

Articles
 Louis Hermann Pammel, Charlotte M. King. 1925. Some New Weeds of Iowa. Circular 98 (Iowa State College. Agricultural Experiment Station). Agric. Experiment Station, Iowa State College of Agric. & Mechanic Arts, 16 p. 1925
 King, Charlotte M. Corn stalk and corn root diseases in Iowa. Agric. Experiment Station, Iowa State College of Agric. and Mechanic Arts, 8 p. 1915
 King, Charlotte M. Four new fungous diseases in Iowa. Agric. Experiment Station, Iowa State College of Agriculture and the Mechanic Arts, 21 p. il. 1912
 King, Charlotte M. Iowa seed analyses, 1910-1913. Agric. Experiment Station, Iowa State College of Agric. & Mechanic Arts, 36 p. 1914
 King, Charlotte M. Notes on eradication of weeds with experiments made in 1907 and 1908. Agric. Experiment Station, Iowa State College of Agric. & Mechanic Arts, 35 p. 1909
 King, Charlotte M. Pollination of clover. Des Moines : Iowa Academy of Science, 10 p. il. 1911
 King, Charlotte M. Results of seed investigations for 1907. Experiment Station, Iowa State College of Agric. & Mechanic Arts, 19 p. 1908
 King, Charlotte M. Results of seed investigations for 1908 and 1909. Experiment Station, Iowa State College of Agric. & Mechanic Arts, 20 p. il. 1910
 King, Charlotte M. Seed analyses of 1913 to 1921. Agric. Experiment Station, Iowa State College of Agric. & Mechanic Arts, 15 p. 1921
 King, Charlotte M. Some plant diseases of 1908. Experiment Station, Iowa State College of Agric. & Mechanic Arts, 24 p. il. 1909
 King, Charlotte M. Studies on a fusarium disease of corn and sorghum, (preliminary). Agric. Experiment Station, Iowa State College of Agric. & Mechanic Arts, 20 p. il. 1916
 King, Charlotte M. Two barley blights, with comparison of species of Helminthosporium upon cereals. Experiment Station, Iowa State College of Agric. & Mechanic Arts, 12 p. il. 1910
 King, Charlotte M. Unlawful Iowa weeds and their extermination. Agric. Experiment Station, Iowa State College of Agric. & Mechanic Arts, 18 p. il. 1912
 King, Charlotte M. The vitality, adulteration and impurities of clover, alfalfa and timothy seed for sale in Iowa in 1906. Experiment Station, Iowa State College of Agric. & the Mechanic Arts, 69 p. il. cartas, 1907

Books
 Louis Hermann Pammel, Charlotte M. King. 1930. Honey Plants of Iowa. Bull. 7, Iowa Geological Survey. State of Iowa, 1.192 p.
 Alvin Romaine Lamb, Arthur Thomas Erwin, Charlotte Maria King, Erastus Waldon Dunnam, et al. 1924. Rural Social Survey of Hudson, Orange and Jesup Consolidated School Districts, Black Hawk and Buchanan Counties, Iowa, v. 217-230. Agric. Experiment Station, Iowa State College of Agric. & Mechanic Arts, 57 p.

References

1864 births
1937 deaths
American agronomists
Women agronomists
American botanists
American women botanists
American mycologists
Women mycologists
Iowa State University faculty
Agriculture in Iowa